Dasyphyllum is a genus of flowering plants in the family Asteraceae. It is distributed in South America, with several species in southeastern Brazil.

Species include:

Etymology of genus name
The genus name Dasyphyllum is a compound of the Greek elements δασύς ( dasus ) 'hairy' and φύλλον ( phyllon ) 'leaf', thus meaning "plant with hairy leaves".

References

 
Asteraceae genera
Flora of South America
Taxonomy articles created by Polbot